In theory of vibrations, Duhamel's integral is a way of calculating the response of linear systems and structures to arbitrary time-varying external perturbation.

Introduction

Background
The response of a linear, viscously damped single-degree of freedom (SDOF) system to a time-varying mechanical excitation p(t) is given by the following second-order ordinary differential equation

where m is the (equivalent) mass, x stands for the amplitude of vibration, t for time, c for the viscous damping coefficient, and k for the stiffness of the system or structure.

If a system initially rests at its equilibrium position, from where it is acted upon by a unit-impulse at the instance t=0, i.e., p(t) in the equation above is a Dirac delta function δ(t), then by solving the differential equation one can get a fundamental solution (known as a unit-impulse response function)

If the impulse happens at t=τ instead of t=0, i.e. , the impulse response is 
，

Conclusion
Regarding the arbitrarily varying excitation p(t) as a superposition of a series of impulses:

then it is known from the linearity of system that the overall response can also be broken down into the superposition of a series of impulse-responses:

Letting , and replacing the summation by integration, the above equation is strictly valid

Substituting the expression of h(t-τ) into the above equation leads to the general expression of Duhamel's integral

Mathematical Proof
The above SDOF dynamic equilibrium equation in the case p(t)=0 is the homogeneous equation:
, where 
The solution of this equation is:

The substitution:  leads to:

One partial solution of the non-homogeneous equation: , where , could be obtained by the Lagrangian method for deriving partial solution of non-homogeneous ordinary differential equations.

This solution has the form:

Now substituting:,where  is the primitive of x(t) computed at t=z, in the case z=t this integral is the primitive itself, yields:

Finally the general solution of the above non-homogeneous equation is represented as:

with time derivative:
, where 
In order to find the unknown constants , zero initial conditions will be applied:
 ⇒ 
 ⇒ 
Now combining both initial conditions together, the next system of equations is observed:

The back substitution of the constants  and  into the above expression for x(t) yields:

Finally substituting , accordingly , where ξ<1 yields:
, where  and i is the imaginary unit.
Substituting this expressions into the above general solution with zero initial conditions and using the Euler's exponential formula will lead to canceling out the imaginary terms and reveals the Duhamel's solution:

See also 
Duhamel's principle

References
 R. W. Clough, J. Penzien, Dynamics of Structures, Mc-Graw Hill Inc., New York, 1975.
 Anil K. Chopra, Dynamics of Structures - Theory and applications to Earthquake Engineering, Pearson Education Asia Limited and Tsinghua University Press, Beijing, 2001
 Leonard Meirovitch, Elements of Vibration Analysis, Mc-Graw Hill Inc., Singapore, 1986

External links
Duhamel's formula at "Dispersive Wiki".

Mechanics
Structural analysis
Integrals